Kristina Halvorson is an American writer, entrepreneur, speaker, podcaster, and expert on the subject of content strategy. She is the founder and CEO of Brain Traffic.

Education and career 

In 1998, after graduating from St. Olaf College, Halvorson left her job working at a movie theatre to work as a freelance copywriter.

Halvorson founded Brain Traffic, a content strategy consultancy, in 2001, which pivoted to content strategy as a service in 2007. 

In 2009, Halvorson authored the first book on the topic of content strategy on the web, Content Strategy for the Web, and is credited as being the foundation of the industry. That same year, she initiated the first Content Strategy Consortium and was the keynote speaker at first Content Strategy Forum in Paris.

In 2011, Halvorson launched Confab, a Minneapolis-based content strategy conference. 

She is the host of The Content Strategy Podcast. She has appeared as a featured speaker at conferences worldwide, including South by Southwest (SXSW).

Halvorson teaches a course on content strategy on Frontend Masters.

Personal life 
Halvorson lives in St. Paul, Minnesota with her two children. She is active on Twitter.

She also advocates for a healthy workplace.

References

Living people
Web developers
American technology writers
St. Olaf College alumni
1971 births
American women podcasters
American podcasters